Two ships of the Russian Navy have been named after Admiral of the fleet of the Soviet Union Sergei Georgiyevich Gorshkov, the former commander of the Soviet Navy.
  - the lead ship of her class of general purpose frigate.

Russian Navy ship names